Beatrice Grannò (born 6 May 1993) is an Italian actress.

Career 
Born in Rome in 1993, Grannò attended a musical academy in Prato and graduated from East 15 Acting School in London in 2016. She began her stage career and made her television debut with a small role in Don Matteo in 2014. In 2018, she starred in the main cast of Rai 1's miniseries Il capitano Maria. In 2019, Grannò played her first leading role in the feature film Wonder When You'll Miss Me, directed by Francesco Fei. She starred as Carla Ardengo in the 2020 film adaptation of Alberto Moravia's novel The Time of Indifference.

Since 2020, Grannò has starred in the Italian medical drama Doc - Nelle tue mani, playing Carolina Fanti.

In 2022, Grannò had a main role in the second season of the HBO anthology series The White Lotus as aspiring lounge singer Mia.

Filmography

References

External links
 

1993 births
Living people
21st-century Italian actresses
Italian film actresses
Italian television actresses
Actresses from Rome